Duddell Street is a small street located near the Lan Kwai Fong district in Central, Hong Kong.  Named after George and Frederick Duddell, it stretches from Ice House Street to Queen's Road Central. The street is noted for containing the city's last four gas lamps.

History
This short street includes, at its southern end, a flight of granite steps that were built between 1875 and 1889; these lead up to Ice House Street.  The street was named in honour of brothers George and Frederick Duddell. Both were landowners in the early days of the colony, having emigrated from Macau after the 1841 annexation of Hong Kong.  George was an auctioneer and ultimately a significant property owner in the area around the present Duddell Street in the mid-19th century.  When Frederick and his wife died, they were both buried back in Macau at the Old Protestant Cemetery.

Gas lamps

The street is famous for its four gas-powered street lamps.  While all other street lamps in Hong Kong are now electric, these four still use town gas. The Hong Kong and China Gas Company continues the operation of the lamps as objects of historical interest. Duddell Street Steps and Gas Lamps are Declared monuments of Hong Kong.

Three of the four street lights have been destroyed on 16 September 2018 during Typhoon Mangkhut.  The historic steps and lamps were repaired by late 2019.

Retail
In June 2009, Hong Kong retail design store G.O.D. collaborated with Starbucks and created a store with a "Bing Sutt Corner" at their store on Duddell Street. It is a concept that fuses the retro bing sutt, a Hong Kong teahouse style with the contemporary look of a coffeehouse.

In April 2012, the flagship store of clothing retailer Shanghai Tang was opened at 1 Duddell Street, known as the 'Shanghai Tang Mansion'. It is close to 1,400-square-metres in size and is the largest branch in the world, designed by Shanghai-based design firm Design MVW.

Photos

See also
 Central and Western Heritage Trail
 List of streets and roads in Hong Kong

References

External links

 Information from Film Services Office
Google Maps of Duddell Street
 

Declared monuments of Hong Kong
Central, Hong Kong
Ladder streets in Hong Kong
Roads on Hong Kong Island